The Orion Community Unit School District 223 is a school district in  Illinois. The district serves pre-kindergarten through twelfth grade students in the communities of Orion, Andover, Lynn Center, Osco, Sunny Hill, Warner, and portions of Coal Valley, Colona, and Green Rock. These communities are located in northwest Henry County and a small portion of southern Rock Island County. The district's 3 schools are all located in the village of Orion. In 2016, the district enrolled 1,088 students and employed 67 teachers, 37% of whom hold a master's degree or higher.  The current superintendent is Mr. Joe A. Blessman. The former superintendent is Dr. David Deets.

Schools

Elementary school
C. R. Hanna Elementary School

Middle school
Orion Middle School

High school
Orion High School

Awards
The Orion Community Unit School District 223 was selected as one of 61 school districts in Illinois to be named a "Bright A+" Award Recipient for 2006. The award was based on those school districts with the highest academic performance in the state of Illinois, and designates the district as among the top 5% of all Illinois.

References

External links
 Orion Community Unit School District 223
 Interactive Illinois Report Card for Orion CUSD 223

School districts in Illinois
Education in Rock Island County, Illinois
Education in Henry County, Illinois